is a Japanese film director, actor, and producer. Considered the most successful filmmaker in the pink film genre in the 2000s, his films are popular with traditional pink film audiences, fans of cinema, and with critics. Because of his prolific contributions to the pink film he has earned the nickname "Mr. Pink".

Life and career
"[Pink Eiga] is my lifework because it lets me earn money, play leading roles and touch naked women."-- Yutaka Ikejima

Yutaka Ikejima was born on March 30, 1948. He studied Literature at Waseda University. He first entered the entertainment business in the late 1970s as an actor with Shuji Terayama's theatrical group Tenjō Sajiki.

His film debut was in the 1981 Genji Nakamura pink film Semi Documentary: Housewife Prostitution Team aka Document Porno: Married Woman Prostitution Techniques. In contrast to his stage career, in his screen work, Ikejima has stayed in the erotic genres. Between 1981 and 1988 he appeared in over 500 softcore pink films, working for such directors as Hisayasu Satō, Yōjirō Takita and Ryūichi Hiroki. Ikejima became one of Zeze Takahisa's "Zeze-gumi" (Zeze-group) of regulars including Takeshi Itō, Yōta Kawase and Yumeka Sasaki. Though most awarded and recognized as a director, Ikejima has continued acting to the present day.

He began his directorial career in 1988, at first working mainly in AVs (adult videos). Through his production company Cement Match, Ikejima both stages plays and self-produces film. Cement Match has made films for all of the major pink film distribution companies, but most often produces for OP Eiga. Through this company he has produced such prominent pink films as Daisuke Goto's A Lonely Cow Weeps at Dawn (2003) and ENK's The Gays in Wonderland (1997). Also active in gay-themed films in both acting and directing careers, the 1996 gay film, Love Me Danger, directed by Ikejima, was chosen the 6th Best Film at the Pink Grand Prix. His Men Who Love (2002) was one of the first pink films to be shown at the Tokyo International Lesbian & Gay Film Festival.

In his pink film directorial career, Ikejima usually collaborates with his wife, screenwriter Kyōko Godai, who had previously made a name for herself scripting for Hisayasu Satō. Known for his professionalism and efficiency, when the original pink film version of The Glamorous Life of Sachiko Hanai went over-budget and behind schedule (because of its ambition and precarious production history, Jasper Sharp characterizes it as the Apocalypse Now of the pink film world), Ikejima was called in to film a temporary replacement, a task he accomplished in a few days. In 2008 Ikejima directed his 100th pink film, an accomplishment for which he was given a special award at the Pink Grand Prix.

Partial filmography

Top-ten films, Pink Grand Prix: As director
 1994 9th place (tie): 
 1995 2nd place: 
 1995 4th place: 
 1996 4th place: 
 1996 6th place (tie): 
 1996 6th place (tie): 
 1997 4th place: 
 1998 1st place: 
 1998 4th place: 
 1998 6th place: 
 1998 7th place: 
 2000 7th place: 
 2000 9th place: 
 2002 3rd place: 
 2002 8th place: 
 2002 9th place: 
 2003 2nd place: 
 2003 9th place: 
 2004 Honorable Mention: 
 2005 9th place: 
 2005 10th place: 
 2006 3rd place: Hostess Madness: Unparched Nectar
 2006 5th place: 
 2006 6th place: 
 2007 8th place: 
 2008 1st place: 
 2008 4th place: 
 2008 6th place:

Pinky Ribbon Awards
 2008 Gold Prize: 
 2008 Pearl Prize:

Bibliography

English

Japanese

References

 
|-
! colspan="3" style="background: #DAA520;" | Pink Grand Prix
|-

|-

|-

|-

1948 births
Japanese male film actors
Japanese film directors
Pink film directors
Japanese pornographic film directors
Pink film actors
Living people